Vanessa Struhler (born November 4, 1985 in Oberhausen, North Rhine-Westphalia), better known as Vanessa S., is a German singer and songwriter who came to fame as a finalist of the first season of the television show Deutschland sucht den SuperStar, the German version of Pop Idol.

Biography
Struhler was born in Oberhausen, (Germany) to a Filipina mother, Lorna Abracosa, and a German father, Klaus Struhler. She has a younger brother, Christian.

In 2002, Struhler participated in the first season of Deutschland sucht den SuperStar. She was only 17 at the time and the youngest contestant. Though she received a wildcard and became the last candidate to join the ten finalists, Struhler was able to boost her popularity constantly with performances of Christina Milian's "When You Look at Me", Oleta Adams' "Get Here" or Vanessa L. Williams' "Save The Best For Last". However, in the end she was voted out on February 8, 2003, and thus got fourth place in the competition. As of 2007, she holds the record for the most times in the bottom three on the series.

After the show, Struhler teamed up with Hip-Hop producer DJ Tomekk to create her debut album. The pre-release duet "Ride or Die (I Need You)", a collaboration with German rapper Trooper Da Don, became a major hit, eventually peaking at No. 4 on the German singles chart. In summer of 2003, Struhler (now performing under her pseudonym Vanessa S.) released her R&B influenced first album Ride With Me. The album managed to peak at No. 30 on the albums chart but failed to earn critical and commercial success, selling 30,000 copies only. Nevertheless, Struhler's records company decided to release three further singles, including the double A-Single "Ey Ey Ey/Back To Life", which became another Top 20 hit.

Vanessa Struhler's second album Independence was released in 2004. The partly self-written album failed to chart on the German 100, but spawned three singles with "Blah, Blah, Blah" featuring David Jassy, "Don't Say (You're Sorry)" and "Bonafide".

Struhler was focusing on Eastern European and Asian markets, and she achieved a Promo Tour in China and gave a concert in Poland.

Albums

Studio albums

Singles

Features
 Bitza feat. Vanessa S. – Take Me Slow (2005) on the album Sinuciderea unui înger
 Taichi feat. Vanessa S. – Leb dein Traum (2006) on the album Top Story
 Robird Styles feat. Vanessa S. – Unendlichkeit (2006) on the album Charterflug
 Taichi feat. Vanessa S. – Keine Wahl (2007) on the album Aussenseiter
 Taichi feat. Kobra & Vanessa S. – Ich denk an dich Pt. II (2006) on the album Aussenseiter

rehearsals

External links
 

1985 births
Living people
People from Oberhausen
Deutschland sucht den Superstar participants
German people of Filipino descent
21st-century German women singers